Air Tahiti Nui Flight 64 (TN64/THT64) was the world's longest domestic flight ever. It was created due to restrictions imposed by the United States over international flights in a context of COVID-19 pandemic. It is considered a domestic flight as French Polynesia forms an integral part of the French Republic.

Historical records

Longest domestic flight 

The world's longest commercial domestic flight was flight TN64 operated by Air Tahiti Nui, a French airline based in French Polynesia. The flight operated between Tahiti's Faa'a International Airport near Papeete to Charles de Gaulle Airport near Paris, France. It covered a great-circle distance of  taking approximately 16 hours and 20 minutes. With its great-circle distance, it set the record both for world's longest domestic flight as well as the world's longest commercial flight.

Air Tahiti Nui began the route on 15 March 2020, departing Faa'a International Airport at 3:14am local time as flight TN64, flying nonstop to Charles de Gaulle Airport and landing at 6:00am local time on 16 March, taking 15 hours and 46 minutes. The Boeing 787-9 operating the flight (registered F-OTOA) was only partially filled with passengers. TN64 continued to operate the flight through March and April 2020, with its final flight on 19 April 2020.

Longest domestic flight (cargo only) 
French Bee operated the longest nonstop domestic cargo flight, from Tahiti to Paris on 14 May 2020, departing Faa'a International Airport at 10:51am local time and landing at Orly Airport at 3:40pm local time on 15 May 2020, taking 16 hours and 49 minutes. This flight did not carry passengers in part as Orly Airport was closed to all commercial passenger traffic from March to June 2020.

Background 
The non-stop routes flown by certain airlines were developed as consequence of the COVID-19 pandemic and the subsequent restrictions imposed by the United States over international flights which came into effect on 11 March 2020. Before the pandemic, the flight between Papeete and Charles de Gaulle Airport in Paris was operated by Air Tahiti Nui as well as Air France with an intermediate stop at Los Angeles International Airport, while the flight between Papeete and Orly Airport in Paris was operated by French Bee with an intermediate stop at San Francisco International Airport. The airlines serving these routes also held traffic rights to transport passengers between either Paris or Papeete and the intermediate stop. Both the Boeing 787-9 used by Air Tahiti Nui and the Airbus A350-900 used by French Bee were claimed by their respective airlines to have greater fuel and energy efficiency compared to other similar or older long-haul widebody aircraft, while flying with a smaller payload to be able to achieve the long distance without stopping for additional fuel.

Air Tahiti Nui, French Bee and Air France have all pursued other stopping points to cover the long distance between French Polynesia and metropolitan France, including stopping at Pointe-à-Pitre International Airport in the French overseas territory of Guadeloupe, as well as stopping at Vancouver International Airport in the Canadian province of British Columbia. However, unlike the intermediate stops in the United States prior to the pandemic, the stop in Vancouver was solely for transit, as none of the airlines could discharge or take on additional passengers at the intermediate stop.

Current record

Longest domestic flight (active) 
It is operated today by two carriers, Air France and Air Austral. Previously operated by Air France as a direct flight with refueling stops, it changed to a non-stop flight following the completion of the new longer runway at Saint-Denis that could accommodate Air France's fully loaded 747s in November 1994. Today it is operated using Boeing 777 and 787s, capable of covering the 11 hour domestic flight with ease. While much shorter than the longest domestic flight ever, it remains the longest operating today, beating the second longest domestic flight from Paris' Orly Airport to Saint-Denis, Réunion by just 12 kilometres.

Longest domestic flights (top 25, by great circle distance)

Discontinued flights

References 

Flight, domestic
Impact of the COVID-19 pandemic on aviation
COVID-19 pandemic in France
Aviation in France
French Polynesia
2020 establishments in France
March 2020 events in France
2020 in aviation
May 2020 events in France
Aviation records